The line of succession to the Presidency of Pakistan is the order in which persons may become or act as the President of Pakistan upon the incapacity, resignation or death of an incumbent President. Pakistan, by law, has a parliamentary democratic system of government that has been modified several times since its inception. The prime minister of Pakistan is the head of the government, while the president of Pakistan, by law and by statute, is a constitutional figurehead.

The constitution does not include a position of Vice President, but in absence of president of Pakistan, the Chairman of the Senate of Pakistan acts as the President. If the Chairman, for any reason, is unable to perform the functions of the office of the president, the Speaker of the National Assembly acts as president until a president is elected. The Electoral College of Pakistan (a special session of the parliament, senate and all four provincial assemblies) elects a new president in accordance with Article 41(3) of the constitution. Amendment XVIII, Article 49 of the constitution of Pakistan covers this matter.

Current order of succession 
The current presidential line of succession, as specified by the Constitution is:

Succession acts

Article 49 
Chairman or Speaker to act as, or perform functions of, President

If the office of President becomes vacant by reason of death, resignation or removal of  the  President the Chairman or, if he is unable to perform the functions of the office of President, the Speaker of the National Assembly shall act as President until a President is elected in  accordance with clause (3) of Article 41.
When the President, by reason of absence from Pakistan or any other cause, is unable to perform  his functions, the Chairman or, if he too is absent or unable to perform the functions of the office  of President, the Speaker of the National Assembly shall perform the functions of President until the President returns to Pakistan or, as the case may be, resumes his functions.

Past presidential successions

See also
Politics of Pakistan
Senate of Pakistan
National Assembly of Pakistan
President of Pakistan
Constitution of Pakistan
Electoral College of Pakistan

References

External links
Government of Pakistan website
The Constitution of the Islamic Republic of Pakistan

Presidents of Pakistan
Pakistan
L